Tamlaght, also Tamlaght O'Crilly, is a small village, townland and civil parish in County Londonderry, Northern Ireland. In the 2001 Census it had a population of 123 people. It is situated within Mid-Ulster District. 

The notable landmarks include Drumard Primary School, Churchtown Presbyterian Church, Tamlaght Church of Ireland and the Family Foodstore, locally known as Roland's due to the name of the owner.

Railways
Tamlaght railway station was opened by the Northern Counties Committee on 1 May 1917. The station closed to passengers on 28 August 1950 by the Ulster Transport Authority.

See also 
List of villages in Northern Ireland
List of civil parishes of County Londonderry
List of civil parishes of County Tyrone
Tamlaght, County Fermanagh
Tallaght, County Dublin

References 

Villages in County Londonderry
Townlands of County Londonderry
Civil parishes of County Londonderry
Civil parishes of County Tyrone
Mid-Ulster District